Harry James C. Lawtey (born 1996) is an English actor. He is known for his role as Robert Spearing in the BBC Two and HBO series Industry (2020–).

Early life
Lawtey was born in Oxford to Northern parents while his father, an aircraft engineer, was stationed at RAF Brize Norton. His brother is now a first-team coach for Notts County F.C. He spent his early childhood in his parents' hometown of Barton-upon-Humber before the family moved to Cyprus when Lawtey was four.

A touring production of Oliver that played at a local Cypriot amphitheatre when Lawtey was thirteen inspired him to pursue acting. While on holiday back in England, he auditioned for the Sylvia Young Theatre School, where he would attend as a boarding student, staying with a host family in Abbey Wood alongside four other boys. He then completed his A Levels at Hurtwood House in 2015. He went on to graduate from the Drama Centre London in 2018.

Career
Lawtey began his career with guest appearances in episodes of the CBBC series Wizards vs Aliens and the BBC One medical soap opera Casualty. In 2016, he made his feature film debut in the crime thriller City of Tiny Lights as Charlie Benson. He played Andrew in the second series of the ITV noir detective series Marcella in 2018.

In 2020, Lawtey began starring as Robert Spearing in the BBC Two and HBO series Industry. He also appeared in an episode of the Netflix fantasy series The Letter for the King. This was followed by a small role as Bobby Andrews in Terence Davies' Benediction in 2021.

Lawtey played Cadet Artemis Marquis in the 2022 mystery film The Pale Blue Eye, which had a wide release on Netflix. He has upcoming roles in the ITV romantic-comedy drama You & Me, Todd Phillips' Joker: Folie à Deux, and the biographical film Anna.

Filmography

Stage

References

External links
 
 Harry Lawtey at Hamilton Hodell

Living people
1996 births
21st-century English male actors
Actors from Oxford
Akrotiri and Dhekelia people
Alumni of the Drama Centre London
Alumni of the Sylvia Young Theatre School
English male film actors
English male television actors
Male actors from Lincolnshire
Male actors from Oxfordshire
People educated at Hurtwood House
People from Barton-upon-Humber